Sayylyk (Sayılık) is a rural locality (a selo), the only inhabited locality, and the administrative center of Silyannyakhsky Rural Okrug of Ust-Yansky District in the Sakha Republic, Russia, located  from Deputatsky, the administrative center of the district. Its population as of the 2010 Census was 771, down from 960 recorded during the 2002 Census.

It is the only inhabited place by the Selennyakh River.

References

Notes

Sources
Official website of the Sakha Republic. Registry of the Administrative-Territorial Divisions of the Sakha Republic. Ust-Yansky District. 

Rural localities in Ust-Yansky District